

History
Royal Prussian Jagdstaffel 5, commonly abbreviated to Jasta 5, was created on January 21, 1916, and mobilized on 21 August 1916, as one of the first fighter units of the Luftstreitkräfte, the air arm of the Imperial German Army during World War I. Many of the first pilots of the Jasta came out of KEK Avillers, itself an early attempt to organize and utilize fighter planes as winged weapons. Jasta 5 began its service career at Bechamp near Verdun, in support of 5 Armee. On 29 September 1916, it moved to the Somme to the 1 Armee area of operations. On 11 March 1917, Jasta 5 moved into Boistrancourt; it spent the next year operating from there, in support of the 2 Armee. In March 1918, the Jasta was joined by Jasta 46 thus forming the beginning of Jagdgruppe 2; the new JG was commanded by Flashar, along with his command of the Jasta. In July, command passed to Otto Schmidt; in August, it was joined in the JG by Jasta 34 and Jasta 37. With approximately 253 victories at war's end, Jasta 5 had the third-highest victory total of any squadron in the Luftstreitkräfte. Its casualties came to 19 pilots killed in action, 3 killed in flying accidents, 8 wounded in action, and 1 injured in an accident.

Commanding officers
 Hans Berr: 21 August 1916 – 2 January 1917
 Ludwig Dornheim: 2 January 1917 – 5 February 1917
 Hans Berr: 5 February 1917 – 6 April 1917
 Hans von Hünerbein: 7 April 1917 – 4 May 1917
 Kurt Schneider: 6 May 1917 – 5 June 1917
 Richard Flashar: 10 June 1917 – 31 December 1917
 Wilhelm Lehmann: 31 December 1917 – 14 January 1918
 Richard Flashar: 14 January 1918 – 12 May 1918
 Wilhelm Lehmann: 12 May 1918 – 26 June 1918
 Otto Schmidt: 3 July 1918 – 11 November 1918

Duty stations (airfields)
 Bechamp: 21 August 1916 – 25 September 1916
 Bellevue Ferme, Senon: 26 September 1916 – 29 September 1916
 Gonnelieu: 30 September 1916 – 10 March 1917
 Boistrancourt: 11 March 1917 – 25 March 1918
 Lieramont: 25 March 1918 – 23 April 1918
 Cappy-sur-Somme: 23 April 1918 – 27 July 1918
 Moislains: 27 July 1918 – 24 August 1918
 Nurlu: 24 August 1918 – 30 September 1918
 Neuville: 30 September 1918 – 7 October 1918
 Escarmain by Capelle: 7 October 1918 – 10 October 1918
 Villers-Sire-Nicole: 10 October 1918 – 11 November 1918

Personnel

There were several notable pilots and flying aces who served and scored with Jasta 5. Pilots earning Prussia's highest decoration for valor, the Pour le Mèrite ("Blue Max") who served at one time or another in Jasta 5 included (alphabetically):
 Paul Bäumer
 Hans Berr
 Heinrich Gontermann
 Hermann Göring
 Otto Könnecke
 Bruno Loerzer
 Fritz Rumey
 Werner Voss

Könnecke and Rumey were two of the three members of the "golden triumvirate", who were responsible for 40% of the total victories of the Jasta.  The third member of the triumvirate not listed is Josef Mai, who although nominated and eligible for the award, was not officially awarded the Pour le Mèrite prior to the end of hostilities.

One member of Jasta 5 was rocket expert Rudolf Nebel.

Aircraft and operations
The squadron was originally equipped with Fokker Eindeckers. It progressed to use of Albatros D.IIs and Halberstadt D.IIs. In 1917, it was using Albatros D.IIIs and Albatros D.Vs. In 1918, it used both the Fokker D.VII and the Fokker Triplane. At one time, the Jasta was one of only three squadrons not belonging to a Jagdgeschwader (fighter wing) that was totally equipped with the Triplane. It also reputedly operated the Pfalz D.XII, which entered service in July 1918.

References

Bibliography

External links
 

05
Military units and formations established in 1916
1916 establishments in Germany
Military units and formations disestablished in 1918